Bellheim is a municipality in the district of Germersheim in the German state of Rhineland-Palatinate. It is situated west of the Rhine, approx. 13 km east of Landau and 15 km northwest of the city of Karlsruhe. 

It is home to the Bellheimer Brauerei (part of Park & Bellheimer AG), a brewery that produces the Bellheimer Lord, Bellheimer Silberpils, and Bellheimer Naturtrüb beers and Bellaris mineral waters. 
Bellheim is the seat of the Verbandsgemeinde ("collective municipality") Bellheim. Bellheim station is on Schifferstadt–Wörth railway and is served by the Karlsruhe Stadtbahn.

Current and former residents

 Anton Spiehler (1795-1867), Catholic bishop secretary, spiritual council and cathedral capitular of the Diocese of Speyer
 Michael Bayersdörfer (1867-1940), politician and Reichstag deputy (BVP) 1924-1933
 Manfred Kramer (born 1939), politician (CDU), member of the Landtag of Rhineland-Palatinate 1981-2003
 Richard Bolz (born 1947), former General of the German Army Aviation Corps
 Georg Gawliczek, (1919-1999), 1955/56 football trainer of Phönix Bellheim
 Andy Becht (born 1974), jurist and politician (FDP), lives in Bellheim

References

External links
Bellheim local government site 
Bellheimer beer 

Germersheim (district)